The Grand Prix Südkärnten is a cycling race held annually in Austria. It was part of UCI Europe Tour in category 1.2 from 2012 to 2014, when it was demoted to a national event.

Winners

References

Cycle races in Austria
Recurring sporting events established in 2001
2001 establishments in Austria
UCI Europe Tour races